P. Fredric Landelius (8 October 1884 – 2 September 1931) was a Swedish sport shooter who competed in the 1920 Summer Olympics and in the 1924 Summer Olympics.

In 1920 he won two silver and one bronze medal as member of the Swedish team. He also participated in the individual running deer, single shots and he finished sixth, in the individual trap his result is unknown.

Four years later, he won the silver medal as member of the Swedish team in running deer, single shots event and the bronze medal in running deer, double shots competition.

In the 1924 Summer Olympics he also participated in the following events:

 100 metre running deer, double shots - fourth place
 Team clay pigeons - fifth place
 individual trap - 14th place
 100 metre running deer, single shots - 17th place

References

External links
profile

1884 births
1931 deaths
Swedish male sport shooters
Running target shooters
Olympic shooters of Sweden
Shooters at the 1920 Summer Olympics
Shooters at the 1924 Summer Olympics
Olympic silver medalists for Sweden
Olympic bronze medalists for Sweden
Trap and double trap shooters
Olympic medalists in shooting
Medalists at the 1920 Summer Olympics
Medalists at the 1924 Summer Olympics
People from Eksjö Municipality
Sportspeople from Jönköping County
19th-century Swedish people
20th-century Swedish people